Courtoy is a surname. Notable people with the surname include:

 Hannah Courtoy (1784–1849), London society woman
 Lambert Courtoys (1520–after 1583), French composer, trombonist, and singer